The Scotland Yard Gospel Choir is an American indie pop band from Chicago.

History
The Scotland Yard Gospel Choir was formed in 2001 by two college graduates with degrees in music. Despite the name, none of the members are from Scotland Yard or London and they do not play gospel music. Matthew Kerstein and Elia Einhorn initially released the four-track recording Do You Still Stick Out in the Crowd, then expanded to a four-piece by adding Ellen O'Hayer and Sam Koentopp, before releasing the single "Jennie That Cries". The group began playing locally in Chicago, soon opening for Arcade Fire, Of Montreal, The Walkmen, The Fiery Furnaces, and Jay Bennett. In late 2003, they released a debut album, titled I Bet you Say That to All The Boys. In 2005, Kerstein and Koentopp left to form a new band, called Brighton MA. Einhorn continued to front SYGC, with their second release, Scotland Yard Gospel Choir, coming out on  Bloodshot Records in 2007.

On September 24, 2009, the band was involved in a major automobile accident while on tour. Their tour van's tire split and the vehicle rolled several times. All members survived.

Band members
Current members
 Elia Einhorn - vocals, guitar
 Mary Ralph - guitar, vocals
 Ethan Adelsman - violin, vocals, guitar
 Jay Santana - drums
 Mark Yoshizumi - bass
 Alison Hinderliter - keys
 Sam Johnson - trumpet, vocals
 Matt Priest - trombone, vocals

Past members
 Sam Koentopp - drums
 Ellen O'Hayer - cello, bass, vocals
 Matthew Kerstein - guitar, vocals
 Devon Bryant - bass

Discography
Albums
 I Bet You Say That to All the Boys (2003)
 The Scotland Yard Gospel Choir (2007)
 ...and the Horse You Rode in On (2009)

Singles
 "Jennie That Cries"/"Not Helicopters" (2002)
 "I Never Thought I Could Feel This Way for a Boy"/"A Good Kind of Crazy" (2003)
 "Clark & Belmont" (2016)

References

External links
 The Scotland Yard Gospel Choir at Bloodshot Records

Indie rock musical groups from Illinois
Musical groups from Chicago
2001 establishments in Illinois
Musical groups established in 2001
Bloodshot Records artists